State Road 134 (NM 134) is a  state highway in the US state of New Mexico. NM 134's southern terminus is at Navajo 12 near McKinley, and the northern terminus is in Sheep Springs at U.S. Route 491 (US 491).

Major intersections

See also

References

134
Transportation in San Juan County, New Mexico
Transportation in McKinley County, New Mexico